The transverse volcanic leopard frog (Lithobates neovolcanicus) is a species of frog in the family Ranidae endemic to the southern edge of the Mexican Plateau, Mexico. Its natural habitats are pine-oak forests and mesquite grasslands near lakes, pools or slow-flowing streams. It is threatened by habitat loss.

References

Lithobates
Endemic amphibians of Mexico
Fauna of the Trans-Mexican Volcanic Belt
Amphibians described in 1985
Taxonomy articles created by Polbot